The Badminton Hall of Fame honors players who have shown exceptional skill at badminton, all-time great coaches and referees, and other major contributors to the game.

There is also a USA Badminton Hall of Fame and a Badminton Canada's Hall of Fame.

Members 
The inaugural members 1996 were Colonel S. S. C. Dolby, Sir George Alan Thomas, Betty Uber and Herbert Scheele. From 1996 to 2009 60 persons were elected to the Badminton Hall of Fame.

References

External links
Official list of inductees
List of BWF awards

Sports halls of fame
Organizations based in Colorado Springs, Colorado
Halls of fame in Colorado
Badminton World Federation
Awards established in 1996
1996 establishments in Colorado